Pamiri could refer to:

Pamiri languages spoken in Afghanistan, Tajikistan, and China
Pamiri people of Afghanistan, Tajikistan